Norbert Hosnyánszky (born 4 March 1984) is a Hungarian water polo player. He competed at the 2008, 2012 and 2016 Olympics and won a gold medal in 2008.

Personal life
Hosnyánszky is married to Jazmin and has a son Zalan (2013) and a daughter Szonja (2017). In 2008 he received the Officer's Cross of the Order of Merit of the Republic of Hungary. In 2015 he had a neck injury in a car accident.

Honours

National
 Olympic Games:  Gold medal - 2008
 World Championships:  Gold medal - 2013
 European Championship:  Silver medal - 2006, 2014;  Bronze medal - 2008, 2012, 2016
 FINA World League:  Silver medal - 2005, 2013, 2014
 FINA World Cup:  Silver medal - 2014
 Junior World Championships: (Silver medal - 2003)
 Junior European Championship: (Silver medal - 2002)
 Youth European Championship: (Gold medal - 2001)

Club
 Hungarian Championship (OB I): 5x (2000 – with FTC; 2007, 2009, 2010 – with Vasas; 2011 – with Eger)
 Hungarian Cup (Magyar Kupa): 2x (2009 – with Vasas; 2015 – with Eger)

Awards
 Szalay Iván-díj (2002)
 Best junior player of year: (2003)
 Member of the Hungarian team of year: 2008, 2013
 Ministerial Certificate of Merit (2012)

Orders
   Officer's Cross of the Order of Merit of the Republic of Hungary (2008)

See also
 Hungary men's Olympic water polo team records and statistics
 List of Olympic champions in men's water polo
 List of Olympic medalists in water polo (men)
 List of world champions in men's water polo
 List of World Aquatics Championships medalists in water polo

References

External links

 

1984 births
Living people
Water polo players from Budapest
Hungarian male water polo players
Water polo drivers
Water polo players at the 2008 Summer Olympics
Water polo players at the 2012 Summer Olympics
Water polo players at the 2016 Summer Olympics
Medalists at the 2008 Summer Olympics
Olympic gold medalists for Hungary in water polo
World Aquatics Championships medalists in water polo
Water polo players at the 2020 Summer Olympics
Medalists at the 2020 Summer Olympics
Olympic bronze medalists for Hungary in water polo
20th-century Hungarian people
21st-century Hungarian people